Arisaema section Attenuata is a section of the genus Arisaema found in tropical and subtropical habitats.

Description
Plants in this section have trifoliate leaves, solitary axillary buds without accessory buds and a sessile spadix appendage that frequently bears sterile flowers.

Distribution
Plants from this section are found from China to Southeast Asia.

Species
Arisaema section Attenuata comprises the following species:

References

Plant sections